TLT LLP is a UK law firm headquartered in Bristol. It was named Law Firm of the Year at The Lawyer Awards 2021. Based on its revenue, TLT was among the top 50 law firms in the UK in 2020, according to The Lawyer. Its revenue was £10m in 2020–21; this represents an increase of 11% on 2019–20 (£9.8m) and a 25% rise on the 2018–19 figure (£8.6m). The firm employs over 1,000 staff. The firm has offices in London and Manchester, Glasgow, Edinburgh and a Northern Ireland subsidiary in Belfast. Overseas, the firm operates an office in Piraeus, Greece. It also has strategic partnerships with European firms GSJ advocaten in Belgium and Holla in the Netherlands to deliver international cross border services for clients.

History
TLT was created in 2000, following the merger of two Bristol based law firms, Lawrence Tucketts and Trumps. Trumps was formed in the 1950s and Lawrence Tucketts in 1985. The earliest strands of both firms go back to the 1800s.

In 2005, TLT acquired niche financial services practice Lawrence Jones and expanded into London. In 2007, TLT acquired commercial law firm Constant & Constant, which doubled the firm's London presence. In 2010 TLT moved to new offices in the City of London.

Eight of the firm's practice areas are top ranked by Chambers UK and 80 of TLT's lawyers are ranked as leaders in their field by the legal guide.

Awards

Best Environmental Initiative Award - People in Law Awards 2022
Tech Dealmaker of the Year at Go:Tech Awards 2022
Law firm of the year, The Lawyer Awards 2021
Highly commended for Law Firm of the Year at the Legal Business Awards
Excellent in Client Care winners at the Scottish Legal Awards 2021
Deal of the Year and Small Deal of the Year at the Southwest Dealmaker Awards
Sunday Times Best Law Firms 2021
One of Europe’s top 50 innovative law firms according to The Financial Times.

References

External links

Law firms of the United Kingdom
Law firms established in 2000
2000 establishments in the United Kingdom
Companies based in Bristol